John H. Batten Airport , also known as Batten International Airport, is a public use airport located  northwest of the central business district of Racine, a city in Racine County, Wisconsin, United States. It is privately owned by the Racine Commercial Airport Corporation. It is included in the Federal Aviation Administration (FAA) National Plan of Integrated Airport Systems for 2023–2027, in which it is categorized as an unclassified reliever general aviation facility.

History
For most of its history, the airport was known as Racine-Horlick Field, but on September 5, 1989, the name was changed to John H. Batten Field. Batten was one of the airport's early founders and supporters as well as the longtime CEO of Racine's Twin Disc, Inc.

During World War II (ca 1941-1945), the newly established airport was used as a flight and ground school for the Army.  Students were housed at Racine College on the south side of Racine.  Ground school instruction was given at Horlick High School and the actual flight training took place at the airport.  Today, the airport is used primarily by local aviation enthusiasts and by the corporate jets of large local companies such as S.C. Johnson & Son and Twin Disc, Inc.

On July 30, 2010, plans were announced to have a full-time aviation maintenance firm on the field, planned to have opened on September 1, 2010.

Facilities and aircraft
4/22 with a 6,574 x 100 ft (2,004 x 30 m) with concrete surface
14/32 measuring 4,422 x 100 ft (1,348 x 30 m) with asphalt pavement

For the 12-month period ending June 15, 2021, the airport had 47,000 aircraft operations, an average of 129 per day: 96% general aviation and 4% air taxi.

In January 2023, there were 57 aircraft based at this airport: 47 single-engine, 5 multi-engine, 2 jet, 2 helicopter and 1 ultra-light.

See also 
 List of airports in Wisconsin

References

External links 
Batten Airport official website
John H. Batten Airport at Wisconsin Department of Transportation

Airports in Wisconsin
Buildings and structures in Racine, Wisconsin
Buildings and structures in Racine County, Wisconsin
Airports in Racine County, Wisconsin